Kemer station is a railway station in İzmir. The station is the oldest railway station in Turkey, built in 1857.

History
In 1856 the Ottoman Empire granted a concession to an English company to build a railway from İzmir to Aydın. The Ottoman Railway Company (ORC) started construction in late 1856 and completed a  line, from the start at Alsancak to Kemer, in 1857. Kemer station was opened. Kemer was chosen to be the main freight depot of the ORC in İzmir. When the railway reached the town of Torbalı in 1860, the first trains started to operate on the line. Freight trains carrying mainly figs, would unload at Kemer depot and would be distributed in İzmir via horse pulled wagons. Freight trains from the south as well as horse pulled caravans from the east and north would unload at Kemer. In its early years Kemer station was the main freight depot in İzmir. When the railway reached Aydın in 1866, most freight would be unloaded in Alsancak. The Turkish State Railways became the new owners of the station in 1935, when they bought the ORC. The station was electrified with 25 kV AC catenary in 2001. In 2006 the station was closed to passenger traffic and rebuilt in 2008, to be re-opened to service in 2010.

Bus connections
ESHOT
 54 Kemer Aktarma - Otogar
 57 Kemer Aktarm - Altındağ
 58 Kemer Aktarm - Kandere
 59 Kemer Aktarma - Bornova Metro
 60 Kemer Aktarma - Pınarbaşı
 64 Kemer Aktarma - Ayakkabıcılar Sitesi
 107 Kemer Aktarma - Esbaş Aktarma
 117 Kemer Aktarma - Kavaklıdere
 153 Kemer Aktarma - Çamkule 
 172 Kemer Aktarma - Gaziemir Semt Garaj
 214 Kemer - Evka 3
 249 Kemer - Evka 4
 348 Kemer Aktarma - Bornova Metro
 418 Halkapınar Metro - Şirinyer Aktarma
 662 Kemer - Cengizhan
 699 Kemer - M.Erener

See also
 Alsancak Terminal
 Turkish State Railways
 Ottoman Railway Company

References

Railway stations in İzmir Province
Railway stations opened in 1857
Railway stations closed in 2006
Railway stations opened in 2010
1857 establishments in the Ottoman Empire
2006 disestablishments in Turkey
2010 establishments in Turkey
Konak District